Liareinae is a taxonomic subfamily of small land snails, terrestrial pulmonate gastropod molluscs in the family Pupinidae.

Genera
Genera within the subfamily Liareinae include:
 Cytora Kobelt and Moellendorff, 1897
 Liarea Pfeiffer, 1853
 Genera brought into synonymy
 Murdochia Ancey, 1901: synonym of Cytora Kobelt & Möllendorff, 1897

References

Pupinidae